Learning Lab (LL) is a research methodology developed in 2011 by Aydin Bal  that provides research-based guidelines for local stakeholders to develop productive family-school-community partnerships and design behavioral support systems that are culturally responsive to diverse needs, strengths, practices, and goals of all stakeholders within a local school community. The Learning Lab builds organizational capacity in schools and school districts by forming an inclusive problem solving team of multiple local stakeholders (teachers, education leaders, families, students, and local community representatives). In Learning Labs, local stakeholders, specifically those who are historically marginalized from schools’ decision-making activities, collectively examine disparities in behavioral outcomes in their local schools and develop solutions through systemic transformation.
 
The Learning Lab methodology was adapted from the change laboratory methodology and is grounded in Cultural Historical Activity Theory. The moral purpose of the Learning Lab is participatory social justice.  Participatory social justice is about non-dominant communities’ equal participation and influence on decision-making activities. The goal of the Learning Lab methodology is to facilitate collective agency among local stakeholders who develop locally meaningful, socially just, and sustainable systemic solutions to educational equity issues such as racial disproportionality in exclusionary and punitive school disciplinary actions (e.g., detention, suspension, and expulsion).

In the Culturally Responsive Positive Behavioral Intervention and Supports Project, the Learning Lab has been implemented at urban pre K-12 schools in the United States. The Learning Lab was found to successfully facilitate and sustain authentic partnerships among local stakeholders that renovated their schoolwide behavioral support systems to be positive, inclusive and culturally responsive.

References

Methodology